Rajshahi Development Authority is a Bangladesh government development authority under the Ministry of Housing and Public Works responsible for the development of Rajshahi City, Bangladesh. Md. Anwar Hussain  is the current Chairperson of the Rajshahi Development Authority.

History
Established in 1825, Rajshahi became a town in 1876. In 1876 Rajshahi Pourashava was established and it was up graded as Rajshahi City Corporation in 1987. With the demand of time Medical College, University, Engineering University, Radio Centre, Airport and many other important establishment were founded in the city. As a result, in many ways importance of the city increased and the city had to grow in an unplanned way. Therefore, to ensure the city growth and development in a planned and sustainable way, Rajshahi Town Development Authority was established in October, 1976 by Ordinance no. 78. The authority announced a Master Plan in 2015 for Rajshahi City covering the next 20 years. In 2019, Rajshahi Development Authority announced 11 development projects with a combined budget of 107 billion taka.

References

1976 establishments in Bangladesh
Organisations based in Dhaka
Government agencies of Bangladesh
Government departments of Bangladesh